Roman provincial currency was coinage minted within the Roman Empire by local civic rather than imperial authorities. These coins were often continuations of the original currencies that existed prior to the arrival of the Romans. Because so many of them were minted in the Greek areas of the empire, they were usually referred to until fairly recently as Greek Imperial coinage, and catalogued at the end of lists of coins minted by the Greek cities. 

When a new region was assimilated into the Roman Empire, the continuance of pre-existing local currencies was often allowed as a matter of expediency. Also, new colonies were frequently given authority to mint bronze coins. These provincial currencies were mostly used by the local inhabitants only for local trade – as their intrinsic values were usually much lower than Roman imperial coinage.

Characteristics

Provincial coins were issued in silver, billon and bronze denominations, though never gold.
The majority were bronze. Silver and billon coins were more common in the Eastern regions of the Empire, particularly Alexandria. In general, the issuance of silver coinage was controlled by Rome. That gave the imperial government a measure of control and influence throughout the empire. Some coins that circulated in the eastern parts of the empire may have been minted at the mint of Rome.

Issuance
By 210 BC Rome was controlling all of the Greek cities in the region of Magna Graecia. At the beginning of the next century a clear Roman influence on the Greek coinage can be noticed. Both iconography and style of the coins had changed. Greek coinage from this period can be classified as the first instances of Roman provincial currency.

There were over 600 provincial mints during the Imperial Era. The mints were located throughout the Empire, with a particular concentration in the Eastern portions of the Empire.

Major provincial cities such as Corinth or Antioch possessed their own minting capabilities. Some mints issued only for their cities (Viminacium) while others issued coins for entire province (e.g. Moesia). There are several cities known by their coins, as there is no historical mention of them.

Gallery

See also
List of historical currencies
Roman currency
Roman Republican coinage

References

External links
Roman Provincial Coins
Coins on Wildwinds.com
Coins with similar Designs
Roman Egypt coins
Area of issues

Local currencies
Coins of ancient Rome